Grand Teton is the highest mountain in Grand Teton National Park, in Northwest Wyoming, and a classic destination in American mountaineering.

Geography 
The mountain is entirely within the Snake River drainage basin, which it feeds by several local creeks and glaciers. The Teton Range is a subrange of the Rocky Mountains, which extend from northern British Columbia to northern New Mexico.

History

Name 
Grand Teton's name was first recorded as Mount Hayden by the Washburn-Langford-Doane Expedition of 1870. However, the name "the Grand Teton" had early currency. The Edition of April, 1901 of the USGS 1:125,000 quadrangle map of the area shows "Grand Teton" as the name of the peak. A United States National Park named "Grand Teton National Park" was established by law in 1929. By 1931, the name Grand Teton Peak was in such common usage that it was recognized by the USGS Board on Geographic Names. Another shift in usage led the Board to shorten the name on maps to Grand Teton in 1970.

In terms of etymology for the mountain's naming, the most common explanation is that "Grand Teton" means "large teat" or "large nipple" in French (téton), named by either French-Canadian or Iroquois members of an expedition led by Donald McKenzie of the North West Company. Unsubstantiated claims exist that the mountain was named after the Teton Sioux tribe of Native Americans, even though this tribe lived about 200 miles (320 km) away in the Dakotas, not Wyoming.  Moreover, in terms of etymology studies, the Teton Sioux tribe's name is stated as being "not related" to the Grand Teton.

First ascent 

There is a disagreement over who first climbed Grand Teton. Nathaniel P. Langford and James Stevenson claimed to have reached the summit on July 29, 1872. However, some believe their description and sketches match the summit of The Enclosure, a side peak of Grand Teton. The Enclosure is named after a man-made palisade of rocks on its summit, probably constructed by Native Americans. Mountaineer and author Fred Beckey believes that the two climbed the Enclosure because their description better matches it and does not accurately describe the true summit, nor does it mention the formidable difficulties found just above the Upper Saddle. Beckey also believes that they summited the Enclosure because it was traditional with members of the Hayden Geological Survey of 1871 to build a cairn in such a place, but no such cairn was found when William O. Owen reached the summit of Grand Teton in 1898.  In all likelihood, The Enclosure was first climbed by Native Americans as suggested by Langford in 1873. Supporters of Owen included The Wyoming Legislature and Paul Petzoldt, former pioneer American climber. Ironically among Langford's supporters was Franklin Spalding, who led the ascent to the summit and tossed the rope that allowed Owen and the others to follow.

Mountaineer and author Leigh Ortenburger researched the controversy in depth, using original source material, for his 1965 climber's guidebook. Ortenburger concluded: "Since historical 'proof' is extremely unlikely to be forthcoming for either side of the argument, perhaps the best way of regarding the problem, short of a detailed analysis of the probabilities, is to state that in 1872 Langford and Stevenson may have climbed the Grand Teton, in 1893 Kieffer, Newell, and Rhyan may have climbed it, and in 1898 Spalding, Owen, Peterson, and Shive definitely did succeed in reaching the summit."

First ski and snowboard descents 

 First male alpine descent: Bill Briggs, 1971
 First female alpine descent: Kristen Ulmer, 1997
 First male Telemark descent: Rick Wyatt, 1982
 First female Telemark descent: A.J. Cargill, 2004 
 First male snowboard descent: Stephen Koch, 1989
 First female snowboard descent: Dani deRuyter, 2010
First male disabled ski descent: Santiago Vega, 2021.

Climbing routes
Grand Teton can be climbed via the Owen-Spalding route (II, 5.4). A short section of the route is highly exposed and previous alpine climbing experience is recommended before attempting an ascent; nonetheless, athletes with no prior climbing experience regularly reach the summit. The Owen-Spalding route is named for the climbers who claim to have made the first ascent: William Owen, Franklin Spalding, Frank Peterson, and John Shive. There is some debate as to which group made the first ascent; see that discussion. Notwithstanding the first-ascent controversy, this climbing route has been firmly named after William Owen and Franklin Spalding.  The Owen-Spalding route begins at the Lower Saddle which is reached by walking from the Lupine Meadows Trailhead to Garnet Canyon and then up to the Lower Saddle on a trail that's fairly well defined. The more technical & exposed part of the climb begins at the Upper Saddle. 
 The most popular route up the mountain is via the Upper Exum Ridge Route (II, 5.5) on the Exum Ridge, an exposed route first climbed by Glenn Exum, co-founder of Exum Mountain Guides. Much of the climbing is fourth class, with one wide step from the end of Wall Street Ledge to the Ridge comprising the first stretch of technical climbing. Other notable pitches include the Golden Stair (immediately following the traverse from Wall Street Ledge), the Friction Pitch (considered the most difficult pitch on the route), and the V-Pitch. The direct start of the Exum Ridge using the Lower Exum Ridge Route (III, 5.7,) is considered a mountaineering classic and is featured in the historic climbing text Fifty Classic Climbs of North America.
In addition to the Direct Exum Ridge Route, the "Classic Climbs" listing also features the North Ridge (IV, 5.8) and North Face with Direct Finish (IV, 5.8), both of which ascend the dramatic northern aspect of the peak.  The Grand Teton has the most routes listed in the Fifty Classic Climbs of North America of any peak.  The only other to have more than one route listed is El Capitan, with The Nose and Salathé Wall.  These inclusions have helped maintain the fame of the peak in the climbing community.  Since the Grand Teton's first ascent, 38 routes with 58 variations have been established.

Ski descent
The Grand Teton has been skied by five routes, each requiring at least one rappel. The first descent on skis was made by Bill Briggs in the spring of 1971 down the East Face and Stettner Couloir, it has since been renamed the Briggs Route. This descent required a free rappel, which was completed with skis on. More casually, skiing is possible from the crest of the saddle between the Grand and the Middle Teton, continuously into the valley floor.

See also
 4000 meter peaks of North America
 Central Rocky Mountains
 Mountain peaks of North America
 Mountain peaks of the Rocky Mountains
 Mountain peaks of the United States
 List of Ultras of North America
 List of Ultras of the United States
 Breast-shaped hill
 Geology of the Grand Teton area

References

External links

Mountains of Grand Teton National Park
Highest points of United States national parks
North American 4000 m summits
Mountains of Wyoming
Mountains of Teton County, Wyoming